Kathryn Graddy is a professor of economics and the dean of Brandeis International Business School at Brandeis University. She is the Fred and Rita Richman Distinguished Professor in Economics at Brandeis University. Her research interests include the economics of art, culture, and industrial organization.

Career 
Graddy received a BS in mathematics and a BA in Russian language from Tulane University, an MBA from Columbia University, and a PhD in economics from Princeton University. Prior to her position at the University of Oxford, she was appointed as an assistant professor of economics at the London Business School. Afterwards, she was a research fellow at Jesus College and then at Exeter College.

After leaving Oxford, Graddy joined Brandeis University in 2007. She chaired the university's department of economics from 2011 to 2014 and directed the PhD program at Brandeis International Business School (IBS) from 2015 to 2016. In 2013, she was made the Fred and Rita Richman Distinguished Professor in Economics. She was named senior associate dean of IBS in 2016, a position she held until she became dean in 2018.

Research 

Graddy's research interests include the economics of art, culture, and industrial organization. She has been widely quoted in the media as an expert on art auctions and investment in art.

As a graduate student, Graddy spent a month shadowing a trader at the Fulton Fish Market to analyze competition within fish markets. In her 1995 study, she described how the traders appeared to charge different prices to different ethnic groups, and perfect competition at the market was not apparent.

In a 2017 paper co-authored with Princeton University economist Carl Lieberman, the two economists concluded that "artists, in the year following the death of a friend or relative, are on average less creative than at other times of their lives." The results were based on an analysis of thirty-three French Impressionist painters and fifteen American artists born between 1910 and 1920. The results, which were featured in the popular press, followed an earlier working paper by Graddy that found that visual artists' creative output suffered during periods of bereavement.

Selected publications

References

External links
 Faculty website
 Dean biography on the Brandeis University website
 

Living people
Cultural economists
Women economists
Brandeis University faculty
Fellows of Exeter College, Oxford
Fellows of Jesus College, Oxford
Academics of London Business School
Princeton University alumni
Columbia Business School alumni
Tulane University alumni
Year of birth missing (living people)